The 1982 NAIA women's basketball tournament was the second annual tournament held by the NAIA to determine the national champion of women's college basketball among its members in the United States and Canada.

Southwest Oklahoma State defeated Missouri Southern in the championship game, 80–45, to claim the Bulldogs' first NAIA national title.

The tournament was played in Kansas City, Missouri.

Qualification

The tournament field was again set at eight teams. All teams were seeded.

The tournament utilized a simple single-elimination format, with an additional third-place game for the losers of the two semifinals.

Bracket

See also
1982 AIAW National Division I Basketball Championship (final version)
1982 NCAA Division I women's basketball tournament
1982 AIAW National Division II Basketball Championship (final version)
1982 NCAA Division II women's basketball tournament
1982 AIAW National Division III Basketball Championship (final version)
1982 NCAA Division III women's basketball tournament
1982 NAIA men's basketball tournament

References

NAIA
NAIA Women's Basketball Championships
Tournament
NAIA women's basketball tournament